is a former Japanese footballer who last played for Grulla Morioka.

Club statistics
Updated to 23 February 2018.

References

External links

Profile at Grulla Morioka

1993 births
Living people
Kanto Gakuin University alumni
Association football people from Iwate Prefecture
Japanese footballers
J3 League players
Iwate Grulla Morioka players
Association football defenders